Debraj Sinha is a director of feature films and ad-films in Kolkata and Mumbai, India. He has also created documentary films.

Filmography

Commercials
Sinha directed commercials for brands including PD Spices, Duta Spices, Triple 7 Match Box, Bausch & Lomb, Monarch Biscuits, Aquatica and Jaya Coconut Oil.

Feature films 
 Raktamukhi Neela—A suspense thriller . It starred Sabyasachi Chakraborty, Dipankar Dey, Dolan Ray and Bhaskar Banerjee)
 Love in Rajasthan—A love-story based in Rajasthan. The film starred Jackie Shroff.
 Akkarshan—A drama depicting women in an urban milieu . It starred Rituparna Sengupta, Samadarshi Dutta, Firdaus, George Baker, Kharaj Mukherjee, Bhaskar Banerjee and Rajatava Dutta.

References

External links 

 The Telegraph First Look

Indian documentary film directors
1974 births
Living people
Film directors from Kolkata